Bazooka Kid is the second studio album by New Zealand rapper PNC.It was released on June 2, 2009

Track listing

References 

http://www.digirama.co.nz/AlbumDetails.aspx?MediaID=1155883

PNC (rapper) albums
2009 albums